Federico Giampaolo (born 3 March 1970 in Teramo) is an Italian former footballer who played as a striker. He is currently the manager of Recanatese.

Career
Like his brother Marco, now a football head coach, Giampaolo started his career at Giulianova. He played his first professional season in 1987–88, and made 27 Serie C2 appearances.

He then joined Juventus youth team. After age of 20, he was loaned to Spezia at Serie C1, Bari at Serie A and Verona at Serie B. In October 1993, he joined Palermo at Serie B, but in the next season he joined Serie B rival Pescara, where he played another 3 Serie B season, including 1996–97 season which scored 16 goals. In summer 1997, Genoa which failed to return to Serie A in the previous season, signed Giampaolo. He scored 10 goals but once again missed to promotion. He played 4 Serie B games at the start of 1998–99 season before joined Salernitana, newcomer of Serie A in October 1998. But Giampaolo Serie A career faced another short end due to Salernitana 1 point below relegation line. After played 2 games for Salernitana, he returned to Pescara, league rival of Salernitana. Pescara finished the least in 2000–01 season, and Giampaolo was loaned to Cosenza at Seire B before returned to Pescara at 2002–03 season, helped the club gain promotion back to Serie B. In July 2005 he changed to play for Ascoli, later obtained Serie A promotion by 2006 Italian football scandal. But he failed to play any games in his last Serie A season, as he moved to Modena F.C. in Serie B on 31 August, before the start of Serie A. In July 2006, he joined another Serie B club Crotone. Crotone finished the second least in the league, and Giampaolo found his place at Cavese of Serie C1 in the next season. He then spent the 2008–09 season with Sorrento. He played for Noicattaro during the 2009–10 season, after which he retired from professional football.

External links
Federico Giampaolo at Footballdatabase
http://aic.football.it/scheda/1053/giampaolo-federico.htm
http://www.gazzetta.it/Speciali/serie_b_2007/giocatori/giampaolo_fed.shtml

Italian footballers
Italy under-21 international footballers
Giulianova Calcio players
Juventus F.C. players
Spezia Calcio players
S.S.C. Bari players
Hellas Verona F.C. players
Palermo F.C. players
Delfino Pescara 1936 players
Genoa C.F.C. players
U.S. Salernitana 1919 players
Cosenza Calcio 1914 players
Ascoli Calcio 1898 F.C. players
Modena F.C. players
F.C. Crotone players
A.S. Noicattaro Calcio players
Serie A players
Serie B players
Association football forwards
People from Teramo
1970 births
Living people
Sportspeople from the Province of Teramo
Footballers from Abruzzo